Razuvayev is a rural locality (a khutor) in Kireyevskoye Rural Settlement, Olkhovsky District, Volgograd Oblast, Russia. The population was 79 as of 2010.

Geography 
Razuvayev is located in steppe, on the Olkhovka River, 16 km northwest of Olkhovka (the district's administrative centre) by road. Kireyevo is the nearest rural locality.

References 

Rural localities in Olkhovsky District